

Herewald was a medieval Bishop of Sherborne.

Herewald was consecrated in 736. He died between 766 and 774.

Citations

References

External links
 

Bishops of Sherborne (ancient)
8th-century deaths
8th-century English bishops
Year of birth unknown